Hovin is a former municipality in Telemark county, Norway.

It was created on 1 January 1886 by a split from Gransherad. Gransherad, which consisted of the parishes Hovin and Gransherad, had already been formed as a border adjustment between Tinn and Hjartdal in 1860. Hovin parish had 815 inhabitants in 1860, and the new municipality had a population of 885 in 1886. On 24 March 1903 an uninhabited part of Tinn was moved to Hovin by royal resolution.

On 1 January 1964 the district of Rudsgrendi with 21 inhabitants was incorporated into Notodden municipality to the east. The rest of Hovin, with 461 inhabitants, was incorporated into Tinn.

The name
The municipality (originally the parish) is named after the old farm Hovin (Old Norse Hofvin), since the first church was built there. The first element is hof, Norse meaning a "temple (for the Norse gods)," and the last element is vin f 'meadow'.
There are several buildings from Hovin at the Norwegian Folklore Museum in Oslo.

References 

Former municipalities of Norway
Villages in Vestfold og Telemark